SKF-97,541 is a compound used in scientific research which acts primarily as a selective GABAB receptor agonist. It has sedative effects in animal studies and is widely used in research into potential treatment of various types of drug addiction.

References 

Serotonin receptor agonists
GABAB receptor agonists
GABAA-rho receptor antagonists
Phosphinic acids